A Family Upside Down is a 1978 American drama television film directed by David Lowell Rich and written by Gerald Di Pego. It stars Helen Hayes and Fred Astaire as an elderly married couple, with Efrem Zimbalist Jr., Pat Crowley, and Patty Duke in supporting roles.

The film was praised for the performances of the cast, earning Astaire a Primetime Emmy Award for Outstanding Lead Actor in a Drama or Comedy Special. It also won a Golden Globe Award for Best Television Film.

Plot
Ted Long (Fred Astaire) is a retiree who suffers a debilitating heart attack that leaves him incapable of caring for himself. Unable to rely on his wife Emma (Helen Hayes), herself suffering from deteriorating health, Ted grows increasingly dependent on his adult children for his basic needs. Familial bonds are tested when Ted and Emma decide to move in with their son Mike (Efrem Zimbalist Jr.) and daughter-in-law Carol (Pat Crowley) rather than face the prospect of living in a retirement home.

Cast

 Helen Hayes as Emma Long
 Fred Astaire as Ted Long
 Efrem Zimbalist Jr. as Mike Long
 Pat Crowley as Carol Long
 Patty Duke as Wendy
 Brad Rearden as Scott Long
 Ford Rainey as Mr. Case
 Kim Hamilton as Paula
 Phillip R. Allen as Dr. Russo
 Carl Held as Al
 Lanna Saunders as Mrs. Lovell
 Belinda Palmer as Rhonda
 Miiko Taka as Mrs. Taka
 David Haskell as House Painter
 R. Norwood Smith as Wes Allen
 Charles Walker as Aide
 Gary Swanson as Instructor
 Gail Landry as Candy Striper
 Matthew Tobin as Dr. Chisholm
 Nolan Leary as Mr. Willy
 Ernestine Barrier as Mrs. Willy

Awards and nominations

References
A Family Upside Down at Library of Congress
A Family Upside Down - Awards & Nominations at Emmys.com
A Family Upside Down Award at Golden Globes.com

External links

A Family Upside Down at Internet Archive

1978 films
1978 drama films
1978 television films
American drama television films
Films about families
Films about old age
Films directed by David Lowell Rich
Films produced by Ross Hunter
Films scored by Henry Mancini
Columbia Pictures films
NBC network original films
1970s English-language films
1970s American films